Orn Chanpolin (born 15 March 1998) is a Cambodian footballer currently playing as a midfielder for Phnom Penh Crown in the Cambodian League and the Cambodia national team.

Career statistics

Club career
Orn Chanpolin made his senior debut in Cambodia League in 2018 For Phnom Penh Crown.

International career
Orn Chanpolin made his senior debut during the 2020 AFC U-23 Championship qualification phase against Australia on 22 March 2019.

International goals

Honours

Club
Phnom Penh Crown
Cambodian Premier League: 2015, 2021, 2022
Cambodian Super Cup: 2022
Cambodian League Cup: 2022

References

1998 births
Living people
Cambodian footballers
Cambodia international footballers
Association football midfielders
Phnom Penh Crown FC players
Competitors at the 2019 Southeast Asian Games
Sportspeople from Phnom Penh
Southeast Asian Games competitors for Cambodia